The Honourable John Dawnay (8 December, 1686 – 12 August, 1740) of Cowick Hall, Yorkshire was a British politician who sat in the House of Commons between 1713 and 1716.

Dawnay was the son of Henry Dawnay, 2nd Viscount Downe and his wife Mildred Godfrey, daughter of William Godfrey, of Thornock, Lincolnshire. He matriculated at Christ Church, Oxford on 16 July, 1703, aged 16 and was created M.A. on 9 July, 1706.

At the 1713 general election  Dawney was returned as Member of Parliament for Aldborough and Pontefract constituencies. There was a petition against the result at Aldborough, but this had not been resolved by the time the Parliament was dissolved in 1715. While there was an outstanding petition against one of the elections, he was not required to choose which constituency he would represent, and so sat for both boroughs throughout the Parliament. He was returned for Pontefract at the 1715 general election until he was unseated on petition on 22 March, 1716.

Dawnay married Charlotte Louisa, daughter of Robert Pleydell, of Ampney Crucis, Gloucestershire, on 10 August, 1724. She died in April 1729. Dawnay died on 31 July, 1740, aged 53, predeceasing his father by one year and was buried on 12 August at Snaith. His sons Henry and John both succeeded in turn to the viscountcy.

References

 

1686 births
1740 deaths
Heirs apparent who never acceded
Alumni of Christ Church, Oxford
Members of the Parliament of Great Britain for English constituencies
British MPs 1713–1715
British MPs 1715–1722
John